Xerospermum noronhianum  is a common Asian tree species described by Carl Ludwig von Blume: it is the type species in the genus and belongs to the Family Sapindaceae.  X. noronhianum Blume is the accepted name and there are no subspecies listed in the Catalogue of Life.
Morphologically, it is a very variable species, found in many kinds of tropical forests and soils, usually below 300 m altitude and rarely above 1000 m.  Its light brown wood is hard and durable, often used in the construction of buildings.

Description
Tree: 25–30 m high when fully grown, often with buttresses at the trunk base.

Leaves: Inflorescences up to 250 mm long if solitary, much shorter if tufted.

Flowers: tetramerous. Sepals free or slightly connate, the outer two usually slightly smaller than the inner ones, ovate to obovate, 1-3 by 1-2.4 mm, outside and inside glabrous or hairy (nearly always inside at the base). Petals: obovate to broadly spathulate, 1-2.8 by 0.5-1.7 mm, short- to long-clawed with an ovate to transversely elliptic blade, variably woolly, nearly always with the exception of the base outside, inside often sparsely hairy to glabrous. 
Stamens: 8 (sometimes 9).

Fruit: lobes ellipsoid to almost spherical: 17-50 by 12–50 mm, with a (very variable) rough, red or dark-brown surface.

There is considerable (but continuous) variation in this species: of leaves, flowers, and especially the fruits.

Distribution and vernacular names
 Bangladesh
 Burma (Myanmar): taung-kyetmauk.
 India (Assam)
 Indonesia: rambutan pacet (Malay), burundul, corogol monyet tjorogol monjet (Sundanese)
 Laos: kho lên, ngèo
 Malaysia: geresek hitam, gigi buntal, rambutan pachet (Peninsular), balong ayam, kata keran
 Philippines
 Thailand: kho laen (eastern), kho hia (south-eastern), laen ban (peninsular).
 Viet Nam: Cây Trường

References

Sapindaceae